Carlo Pelagatti (born 8 January 1989) is an Italian footballer who plays as a defender for  club Carrarese.

Club career
On 2 September 2013 he was signed by Bassano together with Filippo Fondi.

He made his professional debut in the Lega Pro for San Marino on 2 September 2012 in a game against Como.

On 26 July 2019, he signed a 3-year contract with Padova.

On 29 July 2022, Pelagatti joined Carrarese on a one-year contract.

References

External links
 
 

1989 births
Living people
Sportspeople from Arezzo
Italian footballers
Association football defenders
Serie B players
Serie C players
S.S. Arezzo players
A.S.D. Sangiovannese 1927 players
A.S.D. Victor San Marino players
Bassano Virtus 55 S.T. players
Ascoli Calcio 1898 F.C. players
Catania S.S.D. players
A.S. Cittadella players
Calcio Padova players
Carrarese Calcio players
Footballers from Tuscany